Party of Drivers is a minor single-issue political party in Poland with the aim of "fighting for the rights of drivers and hauliers".

References

External links
 Official website

2019 establishments in Poland
Political parties established in 2019
Right-wing populism in Poland
Right-wing populist parties
Confederation Liberty and Independence